Candide Thovex (born 22 May 1982) is a French professional skier, filmmaker and entrepreneur. He is known for his creative freestyle skiing movies and professional accomplishments. His point of view videos routinely go viral on the internet and are viewed by tens of millions. He is widely considered to be one of the best freeskiers in the history of the sport.

He is the brother of snowboarder Mirabelle Thovex.

Youth 
Candide Thovex was born 22 May 1982 in Annecy, in the Haute-Savoie area of France, and grew up in the village of La Clusaz.

He learned to ski at the age of 2.5 in the Aravis region of the French Alps. As a 4-year-old, he began building little jumps behind his house, and at 5 he joined the local skier club where he developed a passion for Mogul skiing. He was 14 when he won his first French National Junior Championships in the mogul division. Even from a young age, he was described by those close to him as "skiing with flair and innovation".

Skiing career

Freestyle career

Early years 
In 1997 Thovex signed his first professional sponsorship contract with leading Australian action sports brand Quiksilver.

In 2000 Thovex returned to the United States to compete in the Gravity Games in Mammoth, California, where he won the Big Air contest. He made his second visit to Chad's Gap and cleanly landed a D-spin 720 the first major rotation over a gap.

From there 'the flying Frenchman' went on to win the Big Air division, his first gold medal at a Winter X-Games in the process. Unfortunately his season ended with Thovex blowing the cruciate ligaments in his left knee.

In the spring of 2001 Thovex was invited to ride at Superpark 3 in Mammoth, California. Thovex proceeded to impress his peers by sticking the 'jump heard around the world'; a 110-foot (33.5 meter) cork 540 tail grab. On the contest side of things, Thovex won the Halfpipe and Big Air contests at that year's X Games in Australia. Thovex's injury from the previous season had left him with plenty of down time. He took advantage of that to launch his career as a filmmaker and created 'WW Prod'. That same year his first production company went on to release the first of 8 films under the 'Rastafaride' title, selling more than 10 000 DVDs of the first video worldwide. He was also voted 'Skier of the Year' by the European specialized media.

2002 was a very busy year. Thovex was constantly filming with his own production company and with others. He continued competing and his contest results remained solid, dominating the Big Air events, winning two in New Zealand, one in Lebanon and another in Switzerland. He earned 2 podiums at the US Open; 2nd place in Superpipe, and 3rd place in Slopestyle.

Pushing boundaries 
In 2003 according to the Association of Freeskiing Professionals, "Candide Thovex and CR Johnson change the face of halfpipe skiing at Winter X Games in Aspen, Colorado by going bigger than any of the snowboarders." Thovex won his second X-Games gold medal. This time it was in Superpipe, an incredible achievement, since he couldn't practice at home because at the time there weren't any superpipes in Europe.  Thovex celebrated by hosting the first ever 'Candide Invitational' at his home resort, La Clusaz. The event gathered the world's best freestylers for a few days of fun and to explore the limits of what could be done on a pair of skis. He also signed a sponsorship deal to develop a pro model with Salomon. This was another season that ended with another injury to his cruciate ligaments, but this time in his right knee.

In 2004 Thovex continued to push back the boundaries of his sport, performing the first ever '810° to rail' and cementing his reputation as the master of all 'new school' tricks and techniques. He was part of Powder's Reader Poll in 2004 where he was placed 6th.

In 2005 the Candide Invitational event was voted best European freestyle event by the international specialised press. The same season Thovex inked a multi-year deal with Rossignol to become the leading ambassador for their 'Scratch' program.

In 2006 Thovex decided to see how high it was possible to fly on skis. To do so, he helped to design and build one of the largest quarter-pipes ever and proceeded to set a world record with a jump of 33 feet (about 10 meters) above the coping.

The injury and the comeback 
2007 was a year of highs and lows; Thovex won his third gold medal at 2007 in Slopestyle, with a record score of 95/100. However, he ended his season coming up short on 'The Big Bertha', another over-the-top jump he'd dreamed up, which resulted in a fracture to his L1 vertebrae. At first, doctors thought he might never be able to ski again or at least that he would never ski at the same level as before; no more tricks, no more big airs.

Returning from injury in 2008, Thovex signed on to ride for Coreupt skis. He also put all his energy into his event, designing features of all shapes and sizes to blend in perfectly with the terrain. At the same time, he started skiing again, but only in perfect powder and far from the crowds. He rode alone, with the exception of his sole companion, Simon Favier who was there to capture all of the action on film. He didn't compete in a single contest.  He was simultaneously putting together his first documentary feature 'The Candide Invitational Story'.

The final product of his adventures riding and filming with Simon Favier was entitled 'Candide Kamera' and was released in 2009. The images were focused exclusively on riding in the backcountry and big mountain freestyle. Wanting to continue in the same vein, Thovex spent the entire season riding powder and filming.

Freeriding / Big mountain freestyle 
After winning a number of major freestyle contests, 2010 marked a sensational return to competition, but now Thovex had turned his sights on unspoiled and unforgiving backcountry faces. However, he wanted to keep things discreet since he hadn't competed since his injury. His comeback started with an invitation to compete in the Red Bull Line Catcher in Vars, France, a prestigious hybrid event, which blends freestyle and freeriding. He was nervous and unsure of his ability to keep up with the other competitors. In spite of his uncertainties, he went on to win the contest. A few weeks later, Candide Thovex was invited to and won the Chamonix stage of the Freeride World Tour (FWT). The win in Chamonix was a deciding factor that convinced him to compete on the tour for the entire season. He finished in second place at the following event. At the last event of the season, the Verbier Xtreme on the face of the infamous Bec des Rosses in Switzerland, Thovex laid down a solid run for an equal 3rd-place finish. The result was just enough to clinch the title of World Freeride Champion.

Film-making career 
Thovex's fascination with the art of filmmaking has always entertained him. Over the course of his professional career he has starred in, and produced numerous videos. Including numerous video segments, Thovex starred in WW production's Rastafaride 7th Heaven.  In 2011, he set to work on a project to document his past with an eye on what the future held in store for him. He skied and filmed the best backcountry conditions available on the planet.

"Few Words" 
The film 'Few Words' was released in 2012. It was an immediate success. The French cable TV channel Canal+ immediately purchased the exclusive rights to the film in Thovex's home country for a period of 2 years, showing it a countless number of times. It was also a bestseller worldwide on iTunes, and in 2013 received the highest honors on offer at the renowned Powder Awards put on by the American ski magazine of the same name; best male performance, best documentary, best cinematography, and the most prestigious of all, the "Full Throttle" award for the most outstanding all around performance of the season. The film was also played to sold out theatres on a 24-country world tour. The same year, Thovex joined forces with Faction Skis to develop a complete range of signature models; meanwhile all the products in his signature model line with longtime sponsor Quiksilver continued to be best sellers.

"One of those days" series

"OOTD" 1 
Thovex decided to devote his 2013 season to producing a new video entitled 'One of Those Days' filmed almost exclusively with his helmet-mounted camera. Filmed entirely from his point of view, 'One of Those Days' (OOTD) was claimed by Powder magazine editor John Clary Davies "The best skier on the planet at his home hill. This is the most fun I’ve ever had skiing and all I did was sit in my office and press play. Movie of the Year. Edit of the Century. Done".

"OOTD" 2 
Released in January 2015, 'One of Those Days 2' pushed the boundaries even further. The video was viewed by more than 1.3 million people per day in the first week, and more than 13 million times in less than 1 month alone. The international media also picked up on the story with articles and video embeds on major websites such as The Telegraph (GB), BBC (GB), The Independent (GB), USA Today (USA), Sports Illustrated (USA), Outdoor (USA), Fox Sports (USA), Stern (GER), Mundo Deportivo (SPA), Paris Match (FRA), l’Equipe (FRA), and Le Point (FRA). Thovex has also made live appearances on CNN and France's Canal+ to talk about the video, which has also featured in other televised reports on TF1, France2, and M6 in France, as well as 1TV in Russia, and on the leading European sports channel, Eurosport.

"OOTD" 3 

On 23 February 2016, Thovex released 'One of Those Days 3', the last in the series of his point of view (POV) ski videos. For the last chapter in the trilogy the production values were higher and a police chase scenario ran through the film. Like the first two, the third episode went viral rapidly with over 6 million views in the first 3 months. France's TF1 network titled their web article 'The virus that is contaminating the web'. On the websites of French media outlets such as 20 Minutes, La Dépêche, and France Info all featured pieces on the video calling Thovex "the king of freestyle". The international press took interest in the release. In their online editions, magazine's like GEO (FRA) and Adventure Journal (USA) as well as The Daily Telegraph (UK) newspaper all made comparisons between Thovex and James Bond. The international news network CNN covered the video release as well. The website article took particular interest in Thovex jumping over a helicopter with its rotors turning. It quotes Thovex saying, "I don't think I would do it again. It was definitely kind of scary. You don't want to finish like a ham." The article then goes on to confirm that, "As well as not ending up like a ham, he also jumped over a paraglider and a peloton of cyclists, skied across a lake and water-skied behind a helicopter in his latest YouTube edit". In the specialized ski press, Powder (USA) magazine said, "The third installment of One of Those Days might be the best yet, as Candide Thovex outdoes himself again, setting the bar in ski edit creativity". After praising the first two edits, Elemental Adventure (UK) expressed the same sentiment on their website, "This time Thovex raised the bar to another level". Mountain sports website, Mountain Watch (AUS) called it, "quite likely the greatest ski video ever". Mashable, the global, multi-platform media and entertainment company presented it on their website as "the most insane ski video ever created". Pitch (UK), a leading independent sports and entertainment marketing agency stated, "Singlehandedly Thovex is taking freesking into the mainstream and cementing himself as a household name in the process".

Following the success of One of Those Days 3, Thovex created a competition where the public was asked to try to emulate his style of skiing, filming and editing. He called it "One of Your Days". The contestants posted videos to the contest website. Thovex chose his 10 favorites, and the public had the final vote. The winner, Carter McMillan was awarded with a day skiing with Thovex at his home mountain of La Clusaz, France.

"Explore Mont Blanc" by Google 
On 21 January 2016, Google released a video entitled: 'Explore Mont Blanc with Kilian Jornet, Ueli Steck, Candide Thovex, and Google Maps' to promote the Street View of Mont Blanc in Google Maps. In the first 4 months it was viewed over 2.6 million times. Google describes the list of individuals who took part in the project as "legendary adventurers". Thovex's role in the project was to help build a jump on top of the Mont Blanc and then perform tricks off of it. It is a feat that French travel and photo magazine GEO says on their website is "unprecedented". In an interview posted on the website of French lifestyle magazine Paris Match, Thovex said it was "the hardest jump of my life". On its website, the top French ski magazine Skieur called it "another first for Candide Thovex" and described him as a "true ambassador of skiing". On the Powder magazine website the article covering the event called Thovex a "skiing legend".

FISE appearance 
On 5 and 6 March Thovex participated in a promotional event organized by FISE in China. 11 and 12 March 2016 Thovex competed in the 3rd edition of the B&E Invitational in Les Arcs, France. It was his only contest appearance of the year. He won 2 of the 5 categories on offer, taking the prize for the Beatcan Best Line, and was named the E-Adrenaline Public Choice Winner. The edit of Thovex's performance at the event posted on his Facebook page has been viewed over 1.7 million times.

Audi Quattro x Candide Thovex

"quattro®" 
On 8 December 2015, Thovex released an advertorial film for Audi to promote their latest Quattro Q7 model. The video, created, produced and directed by Thovex, featured Thovex skiing and performing tricks on many surfaces including dirt, grass, fallen leaves and asphalt, but no snow. It was viewed over 1 million times on the first day on Thovex's YouTube channel. It was viewed 2.5 million times in the first 3 days and has been viewed over 7.5 million times since being posted to his official YouTube and Facebook accounts. Powder, a reference in the sport of skiing summed it up simply on the website of the magazine: "Candide doesn’t need snow".

In October 2016, 'Candide Thovex – quattro' filmed by Simon Favier and directed by Thovex won two prizes at the Top/Com Grands Prix Consumer 2016 awards held at the Congrès de la Communication Consumer (Conference on Consumer Communication) in Paris. The competition rewards the best advertisements and advertising campaigns of the year in France in a variety of categories.  The film won the best 'Publicité on Line' (On Line Advertisement) and the Prix Spécial de l’Expression (Special Prize for Expression).

"quattro 2: Ski the World" 
In January 2017, Audi invited Thovex to direct and produce the sequel to his original quattro video. Entitled Quattro2 (25) and also known as "Ski The World", it is a travel adventure that required 9 months to research and scout appropriate locations. It was filmed over the course of 3 months at over 30 locations in 10 countries where Thovex skied on a variety of surfaces, except snow: grass, sand, water, lava, stone, and different types of earth from jungle floor to mountains of gravelly dirt. After 2 months of post-production work the film was released on 22 January 2018. It was viewed over 65 million times in the first 2 weeks across all of Thovex and Audi's social media channels. The background story of the video is featured on the Audi website (30).

In March 2018 "Ski The World" was entered into competition at the fourth edition of the New York City Drone Film Festival where it won the Extreme Sports and Best in Show categories. (28) It was also entered in the UK's ShAFF (Sheffield Adventure Film Festival) where it won three awards: silver in Best Film, silver in Best Adrenaline Film, and bronze in the Best Short Film category. (27)

Press coverage 
The press coverage of the video from specialized and general sports websites, as well as lifestyle, business and mainstream news outlets was international, with reports in no less than 9 countries including: France (1)(2), Switzerland (3), Germany (4)(5), Spain (6), Greece (7)(8), Ireland (9), Great Britain (10)(11), Canada (12) and the United States (13)(14).

French medias 
France's leading sports media, L’Equipe reminded its readers that Thovex is "the French skiing legend, from who each new video is an event" (15), and the country's specialized ski website Skieur said, "once again he wins his crazy bet to impress us, to make us forget his last video and to once again push back the limits of what is possible" (17). The French language Swiss news website La Côte also mentioned Thovex, "setting the bar in the stratosphere" in the title of its article and noted the viral performance of the video reporting that "at 8pm, barely two hours after it had been posted online, the video had already been viewed more than 2.2 million times on his Facebook page and more than 2 million times on the specialized platform Zapiks". (26)

The international trend and pop culture website Konbini called Thovex a "legend of freeskiing" and noted that having no background music "just the sound of infernal and interminable sliding" made the video "a hypnotic visual trip" (16). The review on Fstoppers, the website of the online community of photographers and videographers read, "Candide Thovex: legend. The French skier’s latest cinematic marvel was released today, and it’s the most epic action sports video of all time. Of. All. Time".(24)

American medias 
Reviews in the American specialized ski media were also complimentary. The magazine Ski entitled their article ‘"Ski the World" Redefines Where Skiing is Possible' and wrote, "you can’t deny that Candide is still at the forefront of the ski world". (19) Powder magazine started their report by calling Thovex "The reigning king of viral ski videos" and explained that, "While having only been online for 72 hours, the video has already garnered nearly a million views on YouTube, which comes as no surprise, as nearly every edit Candide has put out since his first "One of Those Days" videos in 2014 has instantly gone viral, even outside the ski community. His second OOTD edit currently sits at 22 million views on YouTube" before concluding, "his newest work confirms yet again why Thovex is one of the greatest skiers of our time" and called the film "five minutes of skiing magic". (20) Freeskier magazine said, "Candide Thovex is actually an alien" (22), and ski and snowboard film production company and media platform Teton Gravity Research called Thovex "otherworldly" and wrote "he accomplishes things on two planks beyond the realm of what most would think is humanly possible" describing his performance in the video as "ski wizardry". (23)

Thovex continues to be very popular in the American ski community, finishing in one of the top 3 places in the 2014, 2015 and 2016 editions of the Powder Magazine Readers Poll.

He has won the Annual Men's Powder Poll four times, three times in a row in 2017, 2018 and 2019 after his win at the inaugural Powder Poll in 2000. (29).

Candide Invitational 
Thovex is the organizer of the Candide Invitational in his hometown of La Clusaz, a competition which gathers freestyle skiing and snowboarding's best talents.
The event was first held in the La Balme area of La Clusaz in 2002, and was last held in 2007.

Candide Collection 
In 2020, Thovex launched Candide Collection, a collection of outerwear, apparel and accessories.

Filmography
He has appeared in many movies, including the Rastafaride series.
13
Propaganda
Royalty
Balance
Focused
Rastafaride 1
Rastafaride 2
Rastafaride 3: French Toast (2003)
Rastafaride 4: Special Delivery (2004)
Rastafaride 5: Pull Up (2005)
Rastafaride 6: Wha'ppen (2006)
Rastafaride 7: Seventh Heaven
Special Delivery
DVD Candide Invitational
Further
Anomaly
War
Candide Thovex Invitational Story
Lost and Found
Strike
Mind the Gap
Happy Dayz
Tangerine Dream
Candide Kamera
Candide Kamera 2

Competition results
1996:
Mogul skiing winner of the French single championship
1997:
Mogul skiing winner of the French single and parallel championships
1999:
4th X Games, Crested Butte, Colorado, Big Air

2000:
1st X Games, Mount Snow, Vermont, Big Air
1st Gravity Games, Mammoth Mountain, California, Big Air

2002:
2nd US Open, Vail, Colorado, Superpipe
4th US Open, Vail, Colorado, Slopestyle
5th US Open, Vail, Colorado, Big Air
2nd World Skiing Invitational, Whistler, BC, Canada, Superpipe
1st Rip Curl Freeski, Saas Fee, SUI., Overall
2nd Rip Curl Freeski, Saas Fee, SUI., Halfpipe
1st Rip Curl Freeski, Saas Fee, SUI., Slopestyle
2nd Rip Curl Freeski, Saas Fee, SUI., Big Air
9th X Games, Aspen, Colorado, Slopestyle
4th X Games, Aspen, Colorado, Superpipe

2003:
2nd World Superpipe Championships, Park City, Utah, Halfpipe
5th X Games, Aspen, Colorado, Slopestyle
1st X Games, Aspen, Colorado, Superpipe

2006:
1st Orage European Feeskiing Open, Laax, SUI., Superpipe

2007:
1st. X games 11, Aspen, Colorado, slopestyle
5th. X games 11, Aspen, Colorado, superpipe
5th Ski Tour, Sun Valley, ID.

2010:
1st. Red Bull Linecatcher
1st. Freeride World Tour Chamonix
2nd. Freeride World Tour Sochi restaged in Chamonix
3rd. Freeride World Tour Verbier
1st. Freeride World Tour Overall
2009–2010 Freeride World Champion

References

Further reading
Olsson, Helen (Sep 2000) "Best of 2001" Skiing page 110
"Candide Thovex takes to the trees" (Nov 2007) Skiing Vol 60 #3:26
Bailer, Darice (2013) Ski Superpipe Lerner Publications Company  page 13

External links 
 News and photographs about Thovex (French blog (in French)
 Thovex interview for The Ski Journal
 Thovex interview for Newschoolers
  

1982 births
Living people
Sportspeople from Annecy
French male freestyle skiers
X Games athletes
Freeskiers